Callia albicornis is a species of longhorn beetle in the tribe Calliini in the genus Callia, discovered by Bates in 1885.

References

Calliini
Beetles described in 1885